Thomas Pye (18611930) was an Australian architect. He worked for over 33 years in the Public Works Department in Queensland. Pye contributed significantly to major buildings including the completion of the Public Offices (Treasury Building) and Rockhampton Customs House, as well as the design for the Lands and Survey Offices (Lands Administration Building). He was responsible for the heightened expectations which produced the best public buildings yet seen in Queensland.

Early life 
Thomas Pye was born in 1861 in Lancashire, England to Edward Pye, a farmer, and Ellen Newett. After receiving “an excellent training” as an architect in England, Pye emigrated to the colonies in c.1882. In 1883, Pye married Emily Ruth Ivy in September, while living in Mosman Bay, Sydney. In 1884, Pye moved to Brisbane and joined the Queensland Public Works Department to take charge of the documentation of John James Clark’s design for the Brisbane Public Offices (Treasury Building). After completion of the plans for the first stage of the Public Offices, Pye resigned from his public post at the end of May 1885.

Clark and Pye 

In 1885, Pye entered partnership with J.J. Clark’s brother George, having previously prepared the drawings for Clark’s Bros’ Brisbane Masonic Hall while employed in the offices of J.J. Clark. He was involved in a number of projects while at the firm, most notably the Imperial Hotel in Brisbane. Clark and Pye ended their partnership in early May 1886.

Public Offices (Treasury Building), Brisbane 

In June 1886 Pye rejoined the Works Department to prepare drawings for the Public Offices. Pye is associated with the preparation of the plans for the first and second sections of the Public Offices – those facing William Street and the Queen’s Gardens respectively. This was only a temporary appointment until he was appointed as a permanent draftsman in December 1889.  During this time, Pye also engaged work with the tenderer for the project, Sydney contractors the Phippard Bros, in 1886 and 1887. In 1890, the drawings for the Public Offices were completed.

Queensland Public Works Department 
In 1892, A.B. Brady, the Engineer for Bridges, took charge of buildings as the Government Architect, and Pye was appointed Chief Draftsman. In 1898, Pye was appointed First Assistant Architect. In February 1902, Pye became District Architect, Southern Division with responsibility for Government buildings south of Gympie. His equivalent for the Northern Division was John Smith Murdoch. In 1904, John Smith Murdoch transferred to the Commonwealth. Consequently, Pye assumed responsibility for the whole of Queensland. In September 1906, Pye was appointed deputy Government Architect and Acting Under Secretary and continued in that office until his retrenchment in August 1921.

Other interests and military involvement 
Pye was a military censor for about five months in 1914, and in September 1915, as a lieutenant-colonel, he was detailed to command Australian Imperial Forces reinforcements on transports. He took keen interest in shooting and was a prominent member of local rifle clubs. The lack of success in private practice may conceal a resumption of his previous role as a gun draftsman.

Later life and death 
After leaving the Works Department, Pye practiced privately in Brisbane. An amateur artist, he was a member of the Queensland Authors’ and Artists’ Association and was a collector for the Queensland Museum. In May 1929 Pye left Brisbane to travel overseas. In 1930, Pye died after catching black-water fever at the Victoria Falls, South Africa. His daughter, Juanita Pye, was one of Queensland’s first female architects.

Significant works 

Responsibility for individual projects during his employment at the Public Works Department is difficult to discern. The Lands and Survey Offices (Land Administration Building)  are considered Pye’s masterpiece. The significant stylistic and technical innovations used in the design of the Lands Offices such as the use of concrete and the Edwardian Baroque style make them almost a decade ahead of comparable Australian buildings. Pye personally supervised the details, including the statuary.

See also

Queensland Heritage Register

References

External links 

Google map of known works in Brisbane, Queensland 
Google map of known works in Queensland 

English emigrants to Australia
19th-century Australian architects
Architects from Brisbane
Arts and Crafts architects
1930 deaths
1861 births
20th-century Australian architects
Architects from Lancashire